Johann Caspar Goethe (29 July 1710 – 25 May 1782) was a wealthy German jurist and royal councillor to the Kaiser of the Holy Roman Empire. His son, Johann Wolfgang von Goethe, is considered one of the greatest German poets and authors of all time.

Biography 
Johann Caspar Goethe was born in Frankfurt in 1710 as the youngest son of Friedrich Georg Goethe and Cornelia Walther. Between 1725 and 1730 Goethe attended the Casimirianum gynmnasium in Coburg, after which he studied law, first in Giessen and for four years from 1731 in Leipzig. In 1738 he was awarded a doctorate of both laws in Giessen. Goethe then worked at the Reichskammergericht in Wetzlar. He became acquainted with the workings of the Perpetual Diet in Regensburg as well as the Aulic Council in Vienna, both important institutions of the Holy Roman Empire.

Around 1740, Goethe undertook an educational tour of Italy about which he wrote a travel book in Italian titled "Viaggo per l'Italia" ("My Journey Through Italy" in English), in which he detailed the cities, buildings and objects he encountered on his travels. At the end of 1741 Goethe returned to his native Frankfurt, where he had owned two adjoining timber houses with his mother since 1733. He aspired to political office in Frankfurt, but was denied because his half-brother Hermann Jakob Goethe was already a member of the council, and direct relatives were barred from holding office in the same city council.

In May 1742, Goethe paid 300 Guilder for the title of "Imperial Councillor" under Karl VII, who had lived in Frankfurt for much of his reign. The Kaiser held Goethe in high esteem, but died in 1745, leaving Goethe unable to pursue his desired career as an imperial diplomat.

Goethe lived the rest of his life as a private citizen. The income from his fortune allowed him to maintain his household without having to work. With the exception of a few excursions, Goethe did not leave Frankfurt for the rest of his life. On 20 August 1748, he married Catharina Elisabeth Textor. At the time of the marriage Johann Caspar was 38 years old; Catharina Elisabeth was 17 years old. 

Catharina Elisabeth moved into the Goethe family house after the marriage. It was here that their son, Johann Wolfgang, was born on 28 August 1749. Goethe had 5 other children, but only Cornelia, born in 1750, survived until adulthood.

After the death of his mother on 1 April 1754, Goethe had the two inter-connected houses remodelled into a spacious new building with 20 rooms and a staircase modelled on the Kaisertreppe in the Römer. The new house provided sufficient space for Goethe's large library and art collection. When the house was sold in 1795, it was recorded that Goethe's library contained approximately 2000 volumes, amongst them legal and historical works, ancient and contemporary literature in several languages, travelogues and theological works. Goethe's art collection consisted entirely of contemporary works by Frankfurt artists; no inventory of the collection has survived. Goethe also collected plaster casts of antique sculptures as well as minerals.

in 1759, French troops occupied Frankfurt during the Seven Years' War. The French city commander, Count Thoranc, stayed in Goethe's house for several months during this time. Goethe found this a nuisance, especially because he was a supporter of Prussia, France's enemy in the war.

After around 1770, Goethe gradually lost his mental facilities. In 1779, he suffered a stroke, followed by a second in 1780. Goethe was paralysed after this second stroke, and died on 25 May 1782. He left his son Johann Wolfgang a considerable fortune of around 90,000 Guilders. Goethe is buried in the family plot at the Peterskirchhof in Frankfurt.

Writings 

 Johann Caspar Goethe, Cornelia Goethe, Catharina Elisabeth Goethe: Briefe aus dem Elternhaus. ("Letters from the Parental Home"), first published in 1960.
 Johann Caspar Goethe: Viaggio per l'Italia ("My Journey Through Italy"), written in 1740 and first published in 1932. It was translated into German in 1986 under the title "Reise durch Italien im Jahre 1740"

References

Sources 

 

People from Frankfurt
1710 births
1782 deaths
Jurists from Hesse
Jurists from Frankfurt
Johann Wolfgang von Goethe
Burials at St Peter's Cemetery, Frankfurt